The Medal of Military Valour may refer to:

 Medal of Military Valor of Italy
 Medal of Military Valour of Canada
 Medal of Military Valor (Uruguay)
 Medal of Valor (Israel)
 Armed Forces of the Philippines Medal of Valor
 List of medals for bravery lists awards with similar names

See also
Cross of Valour (disambiguation)
Star of Military Valour